Gurjit Singh is an Indian civil servant of the Indian Foreign Service cadre and a former Indian ambassador to Germany.

Early life and education
Ambassador Singh finished his schooling at Mayo College, Ajmer and obtained his bachelor's degree in Politics at the St. Xaviers College, Kolkata.  He is a Post Graduate in International Studies from the School of International Studies, Jawaharlal Nehru University, New Delhi.

Indian Foreign Service
He is a 1980 batch officer of the Indian Foreign Service. He started his career in Diplomacy with a posting in Japan and has since been posted in Sri Lanka, Kenya and Italy.

Positions held
Ambassador of India to Germany
Ambassador to Indonesia. Also concurrently Ambassador of India to ASEAN and Timor-Leste.
Ambassador to Ethiopia and Representative of India to the African Union, UNECA and IGAD.
Ambassador to Republic of Djibouti.
Deputy Permanent Representative of India to UNEP and UN-HABITAT.

Publications
He has authored five books:
 The Abalone Factor on India-Japan business relations. This book was awarded the Bimal  Sanyal Award for Research by an Indian Foreign Service officer.
 The Injera and the Paratha on India and Ethiopia.  
 Masala Bumbu on India-Indonesia relationship.
 A comic book called Travels through Time on India-Indonesia relationship. 
 Opportunity Beckons: Adding Momentum to the Indo-German Partnership.

See also
Indian Ambassadors to the Federal Republic of Germany

References

External links
 Embassy of India,Berlin - Germany

Living people
Ambassadors of India to Germany
Indian Foreign Service officers
Ambassadors of India to Ethiopia
Ambassadors of India to Indonesia
Ambassadors of India to Djibouti
1958 births